Bihar Legislative Assembly election, 1985 was held in March 1985 to elect members to the Bihar Legislative Assembly. The Indian National Congress won a majority of seats and the popular vote and Bindeshwari Dubey became the new Chief Minister of Bihar.

Result

Source:

Elected members

References

1985
1985
Bihar